The IPSC US Handgun Championship are yearly IPSC level 3 matches held by the United States Practical Shooting Association (USPSA) run under IPSC-rules (contrary to the USPSA Handgun Championship, which is run under USPSA-rules). Sometimes, all of the pistol IPSC nationals are held at the same time, other years, they have been broken up between different ranges. In order to attend the nationals a competitor usually has to win a "slot" by placing well enough at various regional and Area Championship matches held throughout the year.

Champions
The following is a list of current and past IPSC US Handgun Champions. There are usually some slots for entry by foreign competitors which will be eligible for the overall match win, but not for the national championship title.

Overall category

Lady category

Junior category

Senior category

Super Senior category

See also
USPSA Handgun Championship
USPSA Multigun Championship
IPSC Handgun World Shoots

References

1978 IPSC US Nationals
1977 IPSC US Nationals, page 10 of 76
1980 IPSC US Nationals, page 68 of 80
Match Results - 2009 IPSC US Handgun Championship
Match Results - 2011 IPSC US Handgun Championship
IPSC Nationals - Charity Match
Match Results - 2012 IPSC US Handgun Championship
Match Results - 2013 IPSC US Handgun Championship
Match Results - 2015 IPSC US Handgun Championship
Match Results - 2019 IPSC US Handgun Championship

External links

IPSC shooting competitions
Handgun shooting sports
Shooting competitions in the United States
United States sport-related lists